Corofin GAA may refer to:

Corofin GAA (Clare), a sports club in Ireland
Corofin GAA (Galway), a sports club in Ireland